The Croats are an ethnic minority in Slovakia, numbering 850 people according to the 2001 census, although the relatively compact patriotic Croatian community may number as many as 3500 people. The Croatian minority has a member in the Slovak Council for Minorities. 

Croats mainly live in the Bratislava Region. They went there during the Ottoman wars in Croatia, with most arriving between 1530 and 1570. This emigration started after the Battle of Mohács in 1528, with most of the migrants coming from the Sisak region, Kostajnica, Čazma, Križevci, Slunj, and Slavonia.

Traditionally Croat-populated villages in Slovakia are Chorvátsky Grob (Hrvatski Grob), Čunovo, Devínska Nová Ves (Devinsko Novo Selo), Rusovce (Rosvar) and Jarovce (Hrvatski Jandrof).

Croatian organisations in Slovakia include the Croatian Cultural Alliance as well as several smaller folklore groups. The writer of the first Croatian-Slovak dictionary, Ferdinand Takač is a Croat from Chorvátsky Grob.

Since Slovak independence, the Croats of Slovakia have maintained good ties with other autochthonous Croatian communities in Austria, the Czech Republic and Hungary.

The former President of Slovakia Ivan Gašparovič is of Croat descent.

See also
 Croatia–Slovakia relations
 Demographics of Slovakia
 Croats
 List of Croats

References

External links 
 Croatian minority in Slovakia
 Croats in Slovakia 

Slovakia
Ethnic groups in Slovakia